Soupe DuBarry (Potage DuBarry or Velouté DuBarry or Crème DuBarry) is a French soup made from cauliflower, potatoes, and stock (traditionally veal stock). The use of stock makes it a velouté; the addition of cream and an egg-yolk makes it a crème.

References

Soups